is a Japanese professional footballer who plays as a forward for  club Kashiwa Reysol and the Japan national team.

Youth career
Born in Ushiku City, he started playing football in the first grade of elementary school, inspired by his father. Hosoya came up through the ranks of the Kashiwa Reysol's academy. He started at Kashiwa Reysol AATOR '82 then moving on through the U-15s whilst at elementary school and junior high school. Due to its close ties with Kashiwa Reysol, Hosoya attended Nippon Sport Science University Kashiwa High School whilst playing for the U-18s.
He made his debut for the U-18s aged 16 in April 2018, when appearing in the Prince Takamado Trophy JFA U-18 Football League in a game against Júbilo Iwata U-18s. The following month, he scored his first goal for the U-18s in a 1–1 draw with Aomori Yamada High School. He went on to make 19 appearances through the 2018 season.

In 2019, aged 17, Hosoya was registered as a top team player for Reysol on a Type 2 contract. He continued to play for the U-18s as well as represent the first team. In 2019 for the U-18s, he made 16 appearances and scored 10 goals in all competitions, including a hat-trick against Júbilo Iwata U-18s.

Club career
Whilst registered as a Type 2 player, in March 2019 Hosoya made his J.League debut in a 2–0 league defeat to Tokyo Verdy, coming on as a 64th-minute substitute for Yusuke Segawa. He scored his first senior goal in a 4–0 Emperor's Cup victory over Iwate Grulla Morioka.
In September 2019, it was announced that Hosoya would be promoted fully to the top team for the 2020 season.

Hosoya only made two league appearances in his rookie season in 2020, largely due to the form of eventual MVP and top goalscorer Michael Olunga and Hosoya generally finding the transition to senior football difficult.

With both Olunga and Hiroto Goya leaving the club at the end of the 2020 season, Hosoya was afforded much more opportunity during the 2021 campaign. He scored his first league goal for the club in a 2–1 defeat to Yokohama F. Marinos after coming on as a late substitute. He went on to make 35 appearances across all competitions and scored 3 goals.

The 2022 season was a breakout season for Hosoya, as he had become the first choice forward for Reysol. He started the season in fantastic form, scoring 6 goals in the first 16 league games. By the end of the season he had made 34 appearances and scored 8 goals and coupled with his impressive performances was enough to earn him the 2022 J.League Best Young Player award.

International career

Youth career
Hosoya was first selected for the Japan national under-19 team in July 2019 as part of a training camp.
He then made his first appearance for the Japan national under-23 football team in October 2021 as part of the qualification campaign for the 2022 AFC U-23 Asian Cup. He played and scored in both of Japan's games, firstly in a 4–0 win over Cambodia and secondly in 4–0 win over Hong Kong. Japan qualified for the main competition after finishing top of their group.

Hosoya then took part in the Dubai Cup U-23 competition in March 2022. He made his first appearance for them in the second game of the competition, starting in a 2–0 victory over Qatar U-23s. He also started in the final of the cup against Saudi Arabia U-23s and scored in the 20th minute. Japan went on to win the game 1–0 and were crowned winners of the competition.

Following a three-day training camp in Chiba in May 2022, later that month it was announced that Hosoya would be part of the squad for the 2022 AFC U-23 Asian Cup. Japan decided to only take U-21 players, even though it was an U-23 competition, in order to better prepare them for the 2024 Paris Olympics. During the tournament, in which Japan finished third, Hosoya started in four of Japan's six games and scored two goals. He scored the winning goal in their opening group game win against United Arab Emirates and scored Japan's second in a 3–0 victory over South Korea in the quarter-finals.

He also scored in a friendly against Switzerland in September 2022 for the U-21s.

Senior career
On 13 July 2022, it was announced that Hosoya had been called up to the senior national team to take part in the 2022 EAFF E-1 Football Championship, alongside teammate Takuma Ominami. He made his debut in a 0–0 draw with China. Japan went on to win the competition.

Career statistics

National team statistics

Honors
Individual
J.League Best Young Player: 2022

Japan
EAFF E-1 Football Championship: 2022

References

External links

2001 births
Living people
Japanese footballers
Association football forwards
Kashiwa Reysol players
J1 League players
J2 League players